MJets is a business jet charter airline based in Thailand.

The company was established 2007 as Minor Aviation by William Heinecke and Nishita Shah. As well as aircraft charter and management the company also has a maintenance operation.

The airline also operates a Fixed Base Operation at Donmueng, Thailand, New Delhi, India and in Yangon, Myanmar.

Fleet 
MJets' fleet consists of the following aircraft:
 Cessna Citation Bravo
 Cessna Citation CJ3
 Cessna Citation X
 Gulfstream G200
 Gulfstream GV

References 

Charter airlines of Thailand
Minor International
Airlines established in 2007
2007 establishments in Thailand